Lasiopetalum ferraricollinum is a species of flowering plant in the family Malvaceae and is endemic to the south-west of Western Australia. It is an upright shrub with densely hairy stems, narrow egg-shaped to oblong leaves and white to cream-coloured and dark red flowers.

Description
The leaves are densely covered with white or rust-coloured, star-shaped hairs. Flowering occurs from August to October.

Taxonomy
Lasiopetalum ferraricollinum was first formally described in 2007 by Eleanor Marion Bennett and Kelly Anne Shepherd in the journal Nuytsia from specimens collected near Forrestiana. The specific epithet (ferraricollinum) is derived from Latin words meaning "pertaining to iron" and "living on low hills", referring to the ironstone hills where this species grows.

Distribution and habitat
This lasiopetalum grows in mallee shrubland on ironstone and laterite hills in the Coolgardie and Mallee biogeographic regions of south-western Western Australia.

Conservation status
Lasiopetalum ferraricollinum is listed as "not threatened" by the Department of Biodiversity, Conservation and Attractions.

References

ferraricollinum
Malvales of Australia
Flora of Western Australia
Plants described in 2007